Cirrhilabrus claire is a species of wrasse native to the Cook Islands. It can be found in the aquarium trade.

References

claire
Taxa named by John Ernest Randall
Taxa named by Richard Pyle
Fish described in 2001